Newbury Racecourse is a racecourse and events venue in the civil parish of Greenham, adjoining the town of Newbury in Berkshire, England.  It has courses for flat races and over jumps. It hosts one of Great Britain's 36 annual Group 1 flat races, the Lockinge Stakes.

History
The racecourse held its first race meeting on 26/27 September 1905 at its current location, in the Greenham area on the south-east side of Newbury, West Berkshire.

The first recorded racing at Newbury took place in 1805 with "Newbury Races", an annual two-day race meeting at Enborne Heath. The meeting lasted until 1811 when it transferred to Woodhay Heath until 1815.

Newbury Racecourse didn't come into existence for another 90 years when Kingsclere trainer, John Porter proposed a new racecourse at Newbury. The Jockey Club had laid down strict qualifications for new racecourses and after Porter's plans were rejected several times, a chance meeting with King Edward VII brought about a further application which with the King's support was approved by the Jockey Club.

In April 1904 the Newbury Racecourse Company was formed and purchased the land and then construction began of the buildings and stables at a cost of £57,240.

On 26 and 27 September 1905 the first ever racemeeting took place at Newbury Racecourse with Copper King ridden by Charlie Trigg and trained by Charles Marnes winning the opening race, the Whatcombe Handicap. Marnes was presented with a Silver Cup (value £25) and Trigg received a gold mounted whip (value £10).

It was fitting that John Porter trained Zelis to win the Regulation Plate on 27 September, providing the only winner at Newbury for course's founder as he retired from training at the end of the 1905 season.

National Hunt racing followed shortly after Flat racing and in 1906, nine days racing were planned for Newbury in 1906 – six on the Flat and three over Jumps. A members badge which also covered the two days in 1905 was priced at 7 guineas.

During the First World War Newbury Racecourse was used as a prisoner-of-war camp for German prisoners.

In September 2020 it was reported that, due to the COVID-19 pandemic, Newbury Racecourse had experienced a 68% loss of turnover for the first 6 months of 2020.

In January 2021 a COVID-19 vaccination centre was established at Newbury Racecourse.

Notable events 

On 14 August 2010, Irish vocal pop band Westlife held a concert for Where We Are Tour supporting their album Where We Are. The concert was sold-out and contributed to a record 30,000 attendance for the following day of racing.

Each year the racecourse hosts two music nights, with acts in recent years including: Jess Glynne, Olly Murs, Craig David, Rudimental and Sir Tom Jones.

Facilities

The racecourse has a dedicated railway station, which sees heavy traffic and additional trains on race days. It also acts as a venue for conferences, meetings, weddings and Hen and Stag parties.

2011 incident
On 12 February 2011, two horses, Marching Song and Fenix Two, collapsed and died in the Paddock while parading for the first race of the day. Two others also appeared to have been affected, Kid Cassidy and The Merry Giant. The novice hurdle race went ahead, starting about 20 min late, but the rest of the day's racing was abandoned.

On 17 February, the preliminary results of the investigation into the incident were released.

Professor Tim Morris, Director of Equine Science and Welfare for the British Horseracing Authority, reported that they had been informed that there had been leakage from an electrical cable running under the parade ring. Both the horses had been examined postmortem and sudden cardiac arrest, consistent with accidental electrocution, had been identified as the cause of death and no other cause of death was further investigated.

Professor Morris also stated:

Notable races

Image Gallery

See also 
Newmarket Racecourse

References

External links

Official website

 
Tourist attractions in Berkshire
Sports venues in Berkshire
Racecourse
Horse racing venues in England
Sport in Newbury, Berkshire
Sports venues completed in 1905
1905 establishments in England